Filomena Costa (born 22 February 1985) is a Portuguese long-distance runner. She competed in the marathon event at the 2015 World Championships in Athletics in Beijing, China.

References

External links
 

1985 births
Living people
Portuguese female long-distance runners
Portuguese female marathon runners
World Athletics Championships athletes for Portugal
Place of birth missing (living people)